This is a list of the 71 Members of Parliament (MPs) elected to the House of Commons of the United Kingdom by Scottish constituencies for the Forty-sixth parliament of the United Kingdom (Feb. 1974 to Oct. 1974) at the February 1974 United Kingdom general election.

Composition

List

See also 

 Lists of MPs for constituencies in Scotland

References

Lists of MPs for constituencies in Scotland
February 1974 United Kingdom general election